Alba Rosana Mbo Nchama (born 13 February 2003) is an Equatorial Guinean sprinter. A national champion, she represented her country at the 2020 Summer Olympics.

Personal life

A two-time national champion, Nchama emulated her mother, who was also a national champion in the 100m and 200m.

Career
Competing at the Athletics at the 2020 Summer Olympics – Women's 100 metres she finished seventh in the first preliminary heat running a time of 13.36 which was a new personal best.

References

External links
 

1993 births
Living people
Sportspeople from Malabo
Equatoguinean female sprinters
Olympic athletes of Equatorial Guinea
Athletes (track and field) at the 2020 Summer Olympics
African Games competitors for Equatorial Guinea
Athletes (track and field) at the 2019 African Games
Olympic female sprinters